Holme is a village in the Alver municipality, located in Vestland county, Norway. The village lies along Herdlefjorden on the western coast of the island of Holsnøy.

References

Alver (municipality)
Villages in Vestland